Khajeh (also Romanized as Khvājeh; also known as Khājeh, Khwāja, and Khadzha) is a city in Khvajeh District of Heris County, East Azerbaijan province, Iran. At the 2006 census, its population was 3,700 in 981 households. The following census in 2011 counted 3,801 people in 1,154 households. The latest census in 2016 showed a population of 4,011 people in 1,265 households.

References 

Heris County

Cities in East Azerbaijan Province

Populated places in East Azerbaijan Province

Populated places in Heris County